Labeo parvus is a species of fish in the genus Labeo from west and central Africa.

References 

parvus
Cyprinid fish of Africa
Fish described in 1902